In Parallel (stylized as IN///PARALLEL) is the debut solo studio album by English musician Dhani Harrison. It was released by BMG Rights Management on 6 October 2017.

Prior to the album's release, the tracks "All About Waiting", "Admiral of Upside Down" and "Summertime Police" were released as part of its promotion.

Track listing

Critical reception

In///Parallel received generally positive reviews from critics upon release. On Metacritic it received a weighted score of 74/100 based on 7 reviews indicating "generally favorable reviews". Stephen Erlewine from AllMusic gave the album a 3.5/5 stars saying "Harrison exudes a quiet confidence, letting IN///PARALLEL unfold surely and steadily, keeping the music meditative and slightly trippy. By some criteria, the circular melodies could be classified as psychedelic, but Harrison's concerns are in the present, not the past. He layers IN///PARALLEL with all manner of electronics, relying on drum loops and synthesizers to create his darkly alluring pop".

References

2017 debut albums
Dhani Harrison albums